The following is a list of alumni of Clare College, Cambridge, a constituent college of the University of Cambridge.

Former students

Academics

Anthony Appiah, philosopher
Eric Ashby, Baron Ashby, botanist and natural scientist, Master of the College 1959–67, Vice-Chancellor of the University of Cambridge 1967–69, founded Clare Hall, Cambridge
Sir David Attenborough, naturalist
John Baker, Baron Baker, scientist and engineer, Professor of Mechanical Sciences (latterly renamed Professor of Engineering) at the University of Cambridge, 1943–70
David Mowbray Balme, classicist, First principal of the University College of the Gold Coast and later University of Ghana 1948 - 57, Professor of Classics, Queen Mary University of London
Amiya Charan Banerjee, mathematician, Vice-Chancellor of Allahabad University 1953–55
Meredith Belbin, management theorist
Roger Blench, anthropologist and linguist
Sir John Boyd, Master of Churchill College, Cambridge 1996–2006
David Cannadine, historian
Hector Munro Chadwick, philologist and historian, Elrington and Bosworth Professor of Anglo-Saxon at the University of Cambridge 1912–41
Mary Collins, immunologist
Ralph Cudworth, philosopher and theologian, leader of the Cambridge Platonists, Master of the College 1644–50, Regius Professor of Hebrew at the University of Cambridge 1645–88
David Dane, virologist
Morris Dickstein, American cultural historian
Daryl Dixon, economic writer and superannuation expert
Julian Downward, cancer researcher
Sir Ernest De Silva, Sri Lankan philanthropist
Sir Geoffrey Rudolph Elton, historian of the Tudor period, Regius Professor of Modern History at the University of Cambridge 1983–88
Eric Fawcett, physicist
David Finney, statistician
Steve Fuller, American sociologist, professor at the University of Warwick
Henry Louis Gates, African-American academic
Sir Harry Godwin, botanist and ecologist, founded the Godwin Institute for Quaternary Research in the University of Cambridge
Trisha Greenhalgh,  professor of primary health care at the University of Oxford
John Guy, leading Tudor historian and Fellow of the college
Nicholas Geoffrey Lemprière Hammond, classicist, historian and archaeologist
James Rendel Harris, biblical scholar, theologian, palaeographer and mathematician
Neil Harris, cultural historian at the University of Chicago, Guggenheim Fellow
Thomas McKenny Hughes, Woodwardian Professor of Geology at the University of Cambridge 1873–1917
Tim Hunt, biochemist
Arthur Jaffe, mathematician and physicist, Professor at  Harvard University
Oscar Kempthorne, Distinguished Professor of Science and Humanities at Iowa State University, statistician and geneticist
Geoffrey Kirk, 35th Regius Professor of Greek at the University of Cambridge 
Frances Kirwan, Professor of Mathematics at Oxford University
Robert Mair, Master of Jesus College, Cambridge
Paul Mellon, benefactor
The Revd. Canon Arthur Peacocke, scientist and theologian, Dean of the College 1973–84
Sir Brian Pippard, first President of Clare Hall, Cambridge, Cavendish Professor of Physics at the University of Cambridge 1971–84
James Raven, Professor of History at the University of Essex
John D. Rosenberg, professor of English at Columbia University
George Ruggle, early seventeenth-century scholar, philologist and playwright
Sir Nicholas John Shackleton FRS, geologist, Professor at the Godwin Institute for Quaternary Research and the Department of Earth Sciences in the University of Cambridge
Cecil Sharp, folklorist and ethnographer
Rupert Sheldrake, scientist
T. C. Smout, historian
Harold McCarter Taylor, architectural historian
Richard Taylor, Professor of Mathematics at Harvard University
Sir Mark Walport, director of Wellcome Trust
James D. Watson, double helix discoverer and human genome advocate
Abraham Whelock, seventeenth-century scholar, philologist and Arabist
William Whiston, Lucasian Professor of Mathematics at the University of Cambridge 1702–11, theologian
Andrew Wiles, mathematician who proved Fermat's Last Theorem
Lauren Winner, professor of theology at Duke University
Simon Wren-Lewis, Professor of Economics at Oxford

Clergy
John Barret (1646–1650), Presbyterian divine and religious writer
M. A. Bayfield (1852–1922), classical scholar, author, headmaster, clergyman and spiritualist
Nicholas Ferrar, religious leader
Rev. John Short Hewett, Rector of Rotherhithe and Fellow of Clare College
Rev. John Hewett founder of All Saints', Babbacombe
James Butler Knill Kelly, Anglican Bishop of Newfoundland
Hugh Latimer, chaplain to Edward VI, Bishop of Worcester and martyr
Thomas Merton, writer, Catholic thinker and monk
John Moore, Bishop of Ely 1707–14
John Tillotson, Archbishop of Canterbury 1691–94
Vernon White, Principal of STETS and Canon of Winchester
The Right Revd. The Lord Bishop Richard Williamson, traditionalist Catholic bishop
Reverend Ralph Wheelock (1600–1684), puritan scholar, first schoolmaster of America's first free school in Dedham, Massachusetts, and great-grandfather of Dartmouth College founder Dr. Eleazer Wheelock, D.D.

Politicians and public servants
Brian Abel-Smith, health economist and special adviser to the Wilson administration.
Sir Alex Allan, chairman of the Joint Intelligence Committee, 2007–11
Patrick Diamond, former special adviser to Peter Mandelson during the first Blair administration.
Sir Ernest Gowers, civil servant and author of Plain Words.
John Hervey, 1st Earl of Bristol, British MP and supporter of the Hanoverian Succession
John Hervey, 2nd Baron Hervey, British MP and eldest son of John Hervey, 1st Earl of Bristol by his second marriage
David Howarth, former Liberal Democrat MP for Cambridge and Fellow of the college
Robert Key, Conservative MP
Jon Lansman, co-founder and chair of Momentum
Peter Lilley, Conservative MP
Liz Lloyd, adviser to former Prime Minister Tony Blair
Tim Loughton, Conservative MP
Matthew Parris, broadcaster, political analyst and former Conservative MP
Thomas Pelham-Holles, 1st Duke of Newcastle-upon-Tyne, Prime Minister of Great Britain
Geoffrey Robinson, Labour MP
Amanda Spielman, Her Majesty's Chief Inspector, Ofsted
Richard Taylor, Independent Kidderminster Hospital and Health Concern, MP
Thomas Townshend, 1st Viscount Sydney, senior British politician after whom Sydney, Australia was named
Richard Wainwright, Liberal MP
Sir John Waldron, Commissioner of the Metropolitan Police, 1968–72
Christopher Wandesford, Lord Deputy of Ireland in 1640
Michael Wills, Labour MP
Paul Wilson, Baron Wilson of High Wray, Governor of the BBC and Lord Lieutenant of Cumbria
Richard Wilson, Baron Wilson of Dinton, civil servant and Cabinet Secretary, Master of Emmanuel College, Cambridge
Ian Winterbottom, Baron Winterbottom, Labour MP and peer

Musicians
Ivor Bolton, conductor and musical director, founded the St James's Baroque Players, founder and musical director of the Lufthansa Festival of Baroque Music, regular conductor at the Bavarian State Opera, Principal Conductor of the Mozarteum Orchestra of Salzburg
Tim Brown, conductor and choral director
Clive Carey, baritone and composer
Nicholas Collon, musician, co-founded Aurora Orchestra and Cappella Artois
Richard Egarr, harpsichordist and fortepianist, musical director of the Academy of Ancient Music
Patrick Gowers, composer, conductor and arranger
Ruth Holton, soprano
Martin How, composer and organist
Andrew Manze, baroque violinist and broadcaster, musical director of The English Concert
Sir Roger Norrington, conductor, founded the London Classical Players
Graham Ross, composer, conductor and Director of Music of the Choir of Clare College, Cambridge 2010–present
John Rutter, composer, conductor, editor, arranger, record producer and Director of Music of the Choir of Clare College, Cambridge 1975–79
David Schiff, American composer
Peter Seabourne, composer, record producer at Sheva Contemporary. Composition pupil of Robin Holloway 1980-83
Richard Stilgoe, songwriter, lyricist and musician
Jeremy Thurlow, composer
Robin Ticciati, conductor, pianist, percussionist and violinist, co-founded Aurora Orchestra
Clive Wearing, musician, musicologist, broadcaster and amnesiac
Christopher Willis, film composer
Maury Yeston, composer, lyricist, musicologist

Others
Desmond Ackner, Baron Ackner, British judge and Lord of Appeal in Ordinary
Peter Ackroyd, author
Robyn Addison, actor, played Sarah Boyer in Survivors and Joanne Coldwell in Casualty
Mohammed Amin, businessman
Sheldon Amos (1835–1886), English jurist
Sabine Baring-Gould, Victorian novelist
Sir Max Bemrose, industrialist
John Berryman, American poet
Stewart Butterfield, Canadian entrepreneur, co-founded photo-sharing website Flickr and the team-messaging application Slack.
Granville Coghlan (1907–1983), rugby union international, represented Great Britain on 1927 British Lions tour to Argentina
Charles Cornwallis, 1st Marquess Cornwallis, British general in the American Revolutionary War
Christian Coulson, actor
Amanda Craig, novelist
Duleepsinhji, cricketer and Indian public servant
Merrick Elderton (1884–1939), cricketer and educator
Sir Michael Le Fanu, Admiral of the Fleet of the Royal Navy
Trent Ford, American actor and model
Sir Paul Girvan, Lord Justice of Appeal, Supreme Court of Northern Ireland
Churchill Gunasekara, cricketer, first player from Ceylon to play for an English county in county cricket
D. D. Guttenplan, American journalist, editor of The Nation
Sir Charles Hanson, 2nd Baronet
Tessa Hadley, novelist
Nick Harkaway, novelist
Georgie Henley, actress, best known for her role as Lucy Pevenise in The Chronicles of Narnia series
Kit Hesketh-Harvey, comic performer and scriptwriter
Sir Bob Hepple, attorney, advocate and anti-apartheid campaigner in South Africa until 1963, specialist in labour law, industrial relations, equality and anti-discrimination law, Master of the College 1993–2003, Professor of Law at the University of Cambridge 1995–2001
Dudley Hooper (1911–1968), British accountant, early promoter of electronic data processing, and President of the British Computer Society
David Jennens, rower who represented Cambridge University and Great Britain
Matt Kirshen, stand-up comedian
 Paul Klenerman (born 1963), Olympic sabre fencer
Sue Lenier, poet and playwright
Randy Lerner, American entrepreneur, owner of Aston Villa and Cleveland Browns
Rebecca Levene, author of Doctor Who novels
Kurt Lipstein, QC, German-born lawyer, specialist in Roman law and conflict of laws within private international law and public international law and pioneer in comparative law, Fellow of the College 1956–2006, Professor of Comparative Law at the University of Cambridge 1973–76
Richard Locke, American critic, former editor-in-chief of Vanity Fair and president of the National Book Critics Circle
Henry Longhurst, sports journalist, television broadcaster
D. Keith Mano, political commentator 
Ian McDonald, writer
David Meek (as David Tyler), television and radio producer
China Miéville, writer
 Professor David Morley, British pioneer in children's health care
 Dame Clare Moulder, former High Court judge
Mohan Munasinghe, environmental campaigner, founder of Munasinghe Institute for Development, vice chair of IPCC which won Nobel Peace Prize 2007 jointly with Al Gore
Stuart Murphy, Chief Executive of the English National Opera
Allison Pearson, author and newspaper columnist
Norman Podhoretz, neoconservative journalist and cultural commentator
Siegfried Sassoon, war poet
Andrew Sentance, Member of Bank of England Monetary Policy Committee, 2006–11, and Chief Economist 1998–2006 at British Airways
Charles Sergel, rower who represented Cambridge University and Great Britain
Najam Sethi, journalist
David Shapiro, American poet
Jirō Shirasu, Japanese bureaucrat, businessman
Matthew Stadlen, producer, editor and journalist for BBC News, presents Five Minutes With...
Gillian Tett, US managing editor of the Financial Times and author of the book Fool's Gold
Marcel Theroux, writer and broadcaster
William Whitehead, Poet Laureate 1757–85
Richard Wald, television executive, former president of NBC News
Stephen Wyatt, television writer
Dan Zeff, director

See also
List of Masters of Clare College, Cambridge

References

Alumni
 
Clare College